Othman Al-Yahri (Arabic:عثمان اليهري) (born 24 June 1993) is a Qatari footballer. He currently plays for Al-Gharafa .

External links

References

Qatari footballers
1993 births
Living people
Muaither SC players
El Jaish SC players
Al-Gharafa SC players
Qatar Stars League players
Association football midfielders
Qatar youth international footballers